The 2016 WTA Tour was the elite professional tennis circuit organised by the Women's Tennis Association (WTA) for the 2016 tennis season. The 2016 WTA Tour calendar comprises the Grand Slam tournaments (supervised by the International Tennis Federation (ITF), the WTA Premier tournaments (Premier Mandatory, Premier 5, and regular Premier), the WTA International tournaments, the Fed Cup (organized by the ITF), the year-end championships (the WTA Tour Championships and the WTA Elite Trophy). Also included in the 2016 calendar is the Summer Olympic Games and Hopman Cup, which were organized by the ITF and did not distribute ranking points.

Schedule
This is the complete schedule of events on the 2016 calendar, with player progression documented from the quarterfinals stage.
Key

Note: In the Champions and Runners-up columns, a tournament's results in doubles are also included.

January

February

March

April

May

June

July

August

September

October

November

Statistical information
These tables present the number of singles (S), doubles (D), and mixed doubles (X) titles won by each player and each nation during the season, within all the tournament categories of the 2016 WTA Tour: the Grand Slam tournaments, the tennis event at the Rio de Janeiro Summer Olympic Games, the year-end championships (the WTA Tour Championships and the Tournament of Champions), the WTA Premier tournaments (Premier Mandatory, Premier 5, and regular Premier), and the WTA International tournaments. The players/nations are sorted by: 1) total number of titles (a doubles title won by two players representing the same nation counts as only one win for the nation); 2) cumulated importance of those titles (one Grand Slam win equalling two Premier Mandatory/Premier 5 wins, one year-end championships win equalling one-and-a-half Premier Mandatory/Premier 5 win, one Premier Mandatory/Premier 5 win equalling two Premier wins, one Olympic win equalling one-and-a-half Premier win, one Premier win equalling two International wins); 3) a singles > doubles > mixed doubles hierarchy; 4) alphabetical order (by family names for players).

Key

Titles won by player

Titles won by nation

Titles information
The following players won their first main circuit title in singles, doubles, or mixed doubles:
Singles
 Irina Falconi – Bogotá (draw)
 Çağla Büyükakçay – İstanbul (draw)
 Viktorija Golubic – Gstaad (draw)
 Laura Siegemund – Båstad (draw)
 Johanna Konta – Stanford (draw)
 Duan Yingying – Nanchang (draw)
 Christina McHale – Tokyo (draw)
 Océane Dodin – Quebec City (draw)
 Kristýna Plíšková – Tashkent (draw)
 Peng Shuai – Tianjin (draw)
Doubles
 Elise Mertens – Auckland (draw)
 Han Xinyun – Hobart (draw)
 Christina McHale – Hobart (draw)
 Verónica Cepede Royg – Rio de Janeiro (draw)
 Varatchaya Wongteanchai – Kuala Lumpur (draw)
 Yang Zhaoxuan – Kuala Lumpur (draw)
 CoCo Vandeweghe – Indian Wells (draw)
 Eri Hozumi – Katowice (draw)
 Miyu Kato – Katowice (draw)
 Andreea Mitu – İstanbul (draw)
 İpek Soylu – İstanbul (draw)
 Xenia Knoll – Rabat (draw)
 Jessica Moore – Bucharest (draw)
 Lu Jingjing – Nanchang (draw)
 Makoto Ninomiya – Tokyo (draw)
 Kirsten Flipkens – Seoul (draw)

Mixed doubles
 Elena Vesnina – Australian Open (draw)
 Heather Watson – Wimbledon (draw)
 Laura Siegemund – US Open (draw)

The following players defended a main circuit title in singles, doubles, or mixed doubles:
Singles
 Angelique Kerber – Stuttgart (draw)
 Serena Williams – Wimbledon (draw)
 Svetlana Kuznetsova – Moscow (draw)
Doubles
 Martina Hingis – Brisbane (draw)
 Sania Mirza – Sydney (draw)

Top 10 entry
The following players entered the top 10 for the first time in their careers:
Singles
 Belinda Bencic (enters at #9 on February 15)
 Roberta Vinci (enters at #10 on February 22)
 Madison Keys (enters at #10 on June 20)
 Johanna Konta (enters at #9 on October 10)

Doubles
 Caroline Garcia (enters at #9 on May 9)

WTA rankings
These are the WTA rankings of the top 20 singles players, doubles players, and the top 10 doubles teams on the WTA Tour, of the 2016 season.

Singles

Number 1 ranking

Doubles

Number 1 ranking

Prize money leaders 
Angelique Kerber topped the 2016 money list and joined Serena Williams as the only two women to ever win over $10,000,000 in a single season. Additionally, Kerber became the 15th WTA player to win $20,000,000 in career earnings. The top-32 players earned over $1,000,000.  Bethanie Mattek-Sands won $1,088,600 in doubles tournaments.  It was the 3rd consecutive year that a player earned over $1,000,000 in doubles events.

Statistics leaders

Points distribution

* Assumes undefeated Round Robin match record.

WTA fan polls

Player of the month

Breakthrough of the month

Shot of the month

Retirements 
Following is a list of notable players (winners of a main tour title, and/or part of the WTA rankings top 100 (singles) or (doubles) for at least one week) who announced their retirement from professional tennis, became inactive (after not playing for more than 52 weeks), or were permanently banned from playing, during the 2016 season:

 Sofia Arvidsson (born 16 February 1984, in Halmstad, Sweden) – She decided to retire in January 2016 at the age of 31.
 Gabriela Chmelinová (born 2 June 1976 in Prague, Czechoslovakia) – Chmelinová announced her retirement from professional tennis in 2016.
 Lourdes Domínguez Lino (born 31 March 1981 in Pontevedra, Spain) – She decided to retire in November 2016 at the age of 35.
 Maureen Drake (born 21 March 1971 in Toronto, Canada) – She announced her second and permanent retirement from professional tennis in August 2016.
 Janette Husárová (born 4 June 1974 in Bratislava, Slovakia) – In February 2016 Husárová announced her retirement from professional tennis.
 Ana Ivanovic (born 6 November 1987 in Belgrade, Serbia) – The former world number 1 announced her retirement from professional tennis December 2016.
 Klaudia Jans-Ignacik (born 24 September 1984 in Gdynia, Poland) – She announced her retirement from professional tennis in August 2016.
 Mathilde Johansson (born 28 April 1985, in Boulogne-Billancourt, France) – Johansson played her final match in the singles 2016 French Open qualifications.
 Sandra Klemenschits (born 13 November 1982 in Salzburg, Austria) – She announced her retirement from professional tennis in October 2016.
 Maria Kondratieva (born 17 January 1982 in Moscow, Russia) – Kondratieva announced her retirement from professional tennis in 2016.
 Klára Koukalová (born 24 February 1982 in Prague, Czech Republic) – She announced her retirement from professional tennis in September 2016.
 Petra Rampre (born 20 January 1980 in Ljubljana, Slovenia) – Rampre announced her retirement from professional tennis in 2016.
 Tamarine Tanasugarn (born 24 May 1977, in Los Angeles, United States) – She announced her retirement from professional tennis in June 2016.
 Vladimíra Uhlířová (born 4 May 1978 in České Budějovice, Czechoslovakia) – She announced her retirement from professional tennis in January 2016.
 Nicole Vaidišová (born 23 April 1989 in Nuremberg, West Germany) – She announced her second and permanent retirement from professional tennis in July 2016.
 Stephanie Vogt (born 15 February 1990 in Vaduz, Liechtenstein) – She announced her retirement from professional tennis in August 2016.
 Yan Zi (born 12 November 1984 in Sichuan, China) – Yan Zi announced her retirement from professional tennis in 2016.

See also

2016 ATP World Tour
2016 WTA 125K series
2016 ITF Women's Circuit
Women's Tennis Association
International Tennis Federation

References

External links
Women's Tennis Association (WTA) official website
International Tennis Federation (ITF) official website

 
WTA Tour seasons
Wta Tour